Naccache can refer to:

People
 Lionel Naccache (1969-), French neurologist
 David Naccache (1967-), cryptographer
See also: Naccache–Stern cryptosystem
 Huda Naccache, Arab-Israeli model

Places 
 Naccache, a suburban area located on the northern edge of Beirut, Lebanon